Xiang Xiang (August 25, 2001 – February 19, 2007) was the first giant panda to be released into the wild after being bred and raised in captivity. Born at the Wolong Giant Panda Research Center in the Sichuan Province, Xiang Xiang endured a three-year training regimen intended to equip him with the skills necessary to survive in the wild. Fitted with a radio-collar upon his release in April 2006, the five-year-old male was tracked each month to check his movements and feeding habits. Despite this extensive preparation, Xiang Xiang was found dead less than a year after his release. The Xinhua News Agency announced the panda's death May 31, 2007, over three months after the incident occurred, citing "the need for a full investigation" as the reason for the delay. Officials from the Research Center determined that a fall from the trees was the probable cause of death. Scratches on Xiang Xiang's body suggest that he was probably being pursued by other pandas when he fell.

References

Individual giant pandas
2001 animal births
2007 animal deaths